Montfaucon-d'Argonne (literally Montfaucon of Argonne) is a commune in the Meuse department in Grand Est in north-eastern France. It is home to the Meuse-Argonne American Memorial.

See also
 Communes of the Meuse department

References

Montfaucondargonne